Cracker Creek Cone is a small cinder cone in northwestern British Columbia. A large lava flow that partly filled Ruby Creek may have originated from this cone. The lower west side of the cone appears to be partly covered by glacial till suggesting that the cone is older than the most recent glacial advances down Ruby Creek. Cracker Creek Cone is in the Northern Cordilleran Volcanic Province and is one of the three young volcanic cones in the Atlin Volcanic Field.

See also
List of Northern Cordilleran volcanoes
List of volcanoes in Canada
Volcanic history of the Northern Cordilleran Volcanic Province
Volcanism of Canada
Volcanism of Western Canada

References
Cracker Creek cone, NW British Columbia, Canada

Atlin District
Cinder cones of British Columbia
Northern Cordilleran Volcanic Province
Holocene volcanoes
Monogenetic volcanoes
Extinct volcanoes
One-thousanders of British Columbia